Yishun Neighbourhood Park is a park located in Yishun, Singapore. The 7.7 hectares park was developed on an old rubber estate and features a hill with an open lawn, ideal for picnics. Facilities include children's playground and fitness equipment.

See also
List of parks in Singapore

References 

Parks in Singapore